Hyunsoonleella aquatilis is a bacterium from the genus of Hyunsoonleella which has been isolated from water from the Jeongbang Waterfall.

References 

Flavobacteria
Bacteria described in 2021